The Isaac Newton Medal and Prize is a gold medal awarded annually by the Institute of Physics (IOP) accompanied by a prize of £1,000. The award is given to a physicist, regardless of subject area, background or nationality, for outstanding contributions to physics. The award winner is invited to give a lecture at the Institute. It is named in honour of Sir Isaac Newton.

The first medal was awarded in 2008 to Anton Zeilinger, having been announced in 2007. It gained national recognition in the UK in 2013 when it was awarded for technology that could lead to an 'invisibility cloak'. By 2018 it was recognised internationally as the highest honour from the IOP.

Recipients 
 2021 - David Deutsch for "founding the discipline named quantum computation and establishing quantum computation's fundamental idea, now known as the ‘qubit’ or quantum bit."
 2020 - Nader Engheta for "groundbreaking innovation and transformative contributions to electromagnetic complex materials and nanoscale optics, and for pioneering development of the fields of near-zero-index metamaterials, and material-inspired analogue computation and optical nanocircuitry".
 2019 - Sir Michael Pepper for "the creation of the field of semiconductor nanoelectronics and discovery of new quantum phenomena"
 2018 - Paul Corkum for "his outstanding contributions to experimental physics"
 2017 – Charles L. Bennett for his "leadership of the Microwave Anisotropy Probe, a satellite experiment that revolutionized cosmology, transforming it from an order-of-magnitude game to a paragon of precision science".
 2016 – Tom Kibble (posthumously) for his "outstanding lifelong commitment to physics".
 2015 – Eli Yablonovitch for his "visionary and foundational contributions to photonic nanostructures".
 2014 – Deborah S. Jin for "pioneering the field of quantum-degenerate Fermi gases".
 2013 – John Pendry for his “seminal contributions to surface science, disordered systems and photonics”.
 2012 – Martin Rees for his outstanding contributions to relativistic astrophysics and cosmology.
 2011 – Leo Kadanoff for "inventing conceptual tools that reveal the deep implications of scale invariance on the behavior of phase transitions and dynamical systems."
 2010 – Edward Witten for "his many profound contributions that have transformed areas of particle theory, quantum field theory and general relativity."
 2009 – Alan Guth for "his invention of the inflationary universe model, his recognition that inflation would solve major problems confronting then-standard cosmology, and his calculation, with others, of the spectrum of density fluctuations that gave rise to structure in the universe".
 2008 – Anton Zeilinger for "his pioneering conceptual and experimental contributions to the foundations of quantum physics, which have become the cornerstone for the rapidly-evolving field of quantum information".

See also 
 University of Glasgow Isaac Newton Medal
 Institute of Physics Awards
 List of physics awards
 List of awards named after people

References

External links 
 

Awards of the Institute of Physics
Physics awards
Isaac Newton